Clunes is a small hamlet, located  on the west shore of Loch Lochy, less than 0.5 miles northeast of Bunarkaig in Inverness-shire, Scottish Highlands and is in the Highland council area of Scotland.

Geography
Clunes lies 4 miles northeast of Gairlochy and 10 miles northeast of Spean Bridge. The B8005 road passes by Clunes, and heads east to Loch Arkaig. This section is known as the Mìle Dorcha (Gaelic for 'dark mile'), as the road runs through a heavily tree-lined, steep sided valley. The Great Glen Way long-distance path also passes by Clunes, as it follows paths and forest tracks alongside Loch Lochy.

References

Populated places in Lochaber